Manchester tart is a traditional English baked tart consisting of a shortcrust pastry shell, spread with raspberry jam, covered with a custard filling and topped with flakes of coconut and a Maraschino cherry. A common variation has a layer of thinly-sliced bananas under the custard.

Manchester tart was a staple on school dinner menus until the mid-1980s. The original Manchester tart is a variation on an earlier recipe, the Manchester pudding, which was first recorded by the Victorian cookery writer Mrs Beeton. 
 
Robinson's Bakers of Failsworth advertises itself as the home of the Manchester tart.

See also
 Custard tart
 List of custard desserts
 List of pies, tarts and flans

References

External links
Manchester Tart – History at Foods of England
A Proper Manchester Tart
Manchester Tart by Nick - Best Recipe Ever

British pies
British desserts
Custard desserts
English cuisine
Lancashire cuisine
Sweet pies
Tarts
Fruit dishes
Foods with jam
Foods containing coconut